Keshik may refer to:
Kheshig, imperial guards of the Mongolian Empire
Keshik, Kerman, a village in Iran

See also
 Kashyyyk, planet in the Star Wars universe and home planet of Chewbacca